The Wicklow & District Football League is an association football league featuring amateur and junior clubs from County Wicklow. The WDFL is a winter league running from September to May. Its top division, the Andy McEvoy Premier 1, is a seventh level division in the Republic of Ireland football league system.

2015–16 clubs

Andy McEvoy Premier 1

List of recent winners

References

7
Association football leagues in Leinster
1